Richard Seed (born 1928) is an American physicist and advocate of human cloning.

Richard Seed may also refer to:

Richard Seed (priest) (born 1949), British religious leader, current head of Archdeaconry of York